The Schönleiten Formation is a geological formation in Austria. Part of the Gosau Group it was deposited during the later Turonian of the Cretaceous period. It primarily consists of grey, weathered yellow shales and dense sandstone, with coal bearing shales near the base. The remains of indeterminate frogs, snakes, Tethysaurines, crocodylians and the teeth of cf. Paronychodon and other indeterminate theropod dinosaurs are known from the formation.

References  

Geologic formations of Austria
Upper Cretaceous Series of Europe
Turonian Stage
Shale formations
Sandstone formations
Coal formations
Coal in Austria